Stokes Early College High School is located in Walnut Cove, North Carolina, in the Meadows community, on the Stokes County Campus of Forsyth Technical Community College. It is part of the Stokes County Schools and is financed and coordinated in cooperation of the New Schools Project of the North Carolina State Department of Public Instruction.

History
Stokes Early College High School opened in the Fall of 2009 with 48 ninth grade students; each year will admit another fifty students until there are grades nine through twelve.  It is a public school that draws from Stokes County Schools, and occasionally surrounding private schools and homeschools, but is selective in admissions and it is an opportunity provided to Stokes County and surrounding county residents, but residency does not insure the right to participate. The principal is David Durham.

Curriculum
Students at Stokes Early College High School experience a rigorous academic schedule throughout all four/five years.

The underclass schedule is very rigorous with the expectation that most of their high school credits will be attained by the time they enter their junior year. Classes are taught on a modified block schedule with holidays that align with Forsyth Tech's schedule. All students have dual enrollment; they are enrolled in both Forsyth Tech and in the Stokes County school system. Juniors and Seniors take classes largely at Forsyth Tech, which count towards their remaining high school credits as well as college credits. Upon admission within the University of North Carolina system, many enter as freshmen with credit and become a junior their second year in the university.

References

External links
 Stokes Early College
 Forsyth Technical Community College

Educational institutions established in 2009
Public high schools in North Carolina
Schools in Stokes County, North Carolina
2009 establishments in North Carolina